Malmesbury Primary School may refer to several schools in the United Kingdom:

Malmesbury Church of England Primary School, Malmesbury, Wiltshire
Malmesbury Primary School, Morden, Greater London
Malmesbury Primary School, Tower Hamlets, London

See also 

Malmesbury Park Primary School, Bournemouth, Dorset, United Kingdom